The Fallschirmjäger memorial is a German
war memorial for German parachutists who fell during the ten-day
Battle of Crete in World War II. The memorial, known to Cretans as the German bird
(Germaniko pouli) or the Evil bird (Kako pouli),
was erected in 1941 by the occupation forces
and is located about three kilometers west of Chania on the road to Agii Apostoli.

Original memorial

The invasion of Crete in May 1941 was the first major airborne assault in history. Despite their victory, the elite German paratroopers suffered such heavy losses that Adolf Hitler forbade further airborne operations of such large scale for the rest of the war. The memorial was erected at the end of a stone staircase leading to the top of a small hill. It consisted of a tall pedestal built from stone blocks, atop which stood a concrete diving eagle gripping a swastika in its talons.

Present state

Originally in the countryside, Germaniko pouli is today encompassed by dense urban buildings and has lent its name to the surrounding area. Apart from the swastika which was covered with cement soon after the liberation of Crete, the memorial stood more or less intact until the early 2000s. In the winter of 2001, a storm demolished most of the eagle's body.
Today, the pedestal and its inscription are in a derelict state and mostly covered with graffiti. There were some discussions and controversy whether it should be restored or demolished. However, in the summer of 2018, the memorial was taken down due to frequent outrage expressed by tourists.

See also
Fallschirmjäger (World War II)
Brothers von Blücher
Cretan Resistance
Kidnap of General Kreipe

Bibliography
 Anna Maria Droumpouki, Μνημεία της λήθης. Ίχνη του Β΄ Παγκοσμίου Πολέμου στην Ελλάδα και στην Ευρώπη, prologue: Hagen Fleischer, Athens: Polis Editions, 2014, pp. 215-222. (in Greek)

External links
 Germaniko pouli pictures

References

Battle of Crete
Crete in World War II
Buildings and structures completed in 1941
World War II memorials in Greece
Fallschirmjäger of World War II
Buildings and structures in Chania (regional unit)